Deer Valley or Deer Valley Village is one of the 15 urban villages that make up Phoenix, Arizona, United States. As of 2010, the population was 165,656, 25% of whom were under 18 years of age. The origin of the name is unclear; it first appeared on a 1921 General Land Office map of the area describing the valley created by Skunk Creek.

Geography
It is located in the northwestern portion of the city, and borders the cities of Glendale and Peoria. Within Phoenix, it borders four other urban villages (North Mountain, Paradise Valley, Desert View, and North Gateway). The core of the village includes commercial, industrial, and multifamily housing developments. Outer areas have more lower density residential land.

Significant geographic features of the village include the volcanic Adobe Mountains and Hedgpeth Hills, Adobe Dam, Skunk Creek, and Scatter Wash.

Employment
As of 2013, major employers were:
 Nokia Finland
 APSM Systems (Electromechanical Manufacturing)
 Honeywell International (Aerospace/Electrical Equipment)
 PetSmart (Retail, Corporate Headquarters)
 Safeway Stores (Customer Service Center)
 Cox Communications (Broadband Communications)
 American Express (Financial Services)
 Wells Fargo Home Equity (Call Center)
 Best Western International (Reservation Center)
 Discover Financial Services (Call Center)
 HonorHealth (Healthcare)

Features and attractions

Deer Valley Airport, one of the busiest general aviation airports in the country is located in the village.  Turf Paradise, a horse racetrack and Wet'n'Wild Phoenix, a  waterpark and the Arizona's largest theme park are both located in Deer Valley.

The Central Arizona Project canal carrying water from the Colorado River at Lake Havasu to Phoenix and Tucson passes through the village.  The Deer Valley Petroglyph Preserve, a  archaeological site containing over 1500 petroglyphs, listed on the National Register of Historic Places and as a Phoenix Points of Pride, is located just west of the village core.

The Adobe Dam Regional Park, a  Maricopa County park, is located here. The park is located behind Adobe Dam in an area primarily designated for flood control. The park includes a sports complex for softball and sand volleyball, a golf course, kart racing track, a radio-controlled aircraft flight facility serving an AMA-chartered model aircraft club, a paintball field, and a  large scale model railroad.

Education
Most children in Deer Valley attend schools of the Deer Valley Unified School District. The school district is much larger than the village, and includes area from several surrounding Phoenix urban villages, as well as parts of Glendale and Peoria. A small portion of the village south of Bell Road is in other school districts. The district has five high schools, two of which are located in the village, Barry Goldwater High School and Sandra Day O'Connor High School. The eponymous Deer Valley High School is located just outside the village boundary in Glendale.

References 

Urban villages of Phoenix, Arizona